Persiaran Utara is a major highway in Putrajaya, Malaysia. It connects Putrajaya-Cyberjaya Expressway interchange in the west to Putra Interchange of the South Klang Valley Expressway in the north.

Lists of interchanges

Highways in Malaysia
Highways in Putrajaya

References